The Roman Catholic Diocese of Cachoeira do Sul is a suffragan diocese in the Ecclesiastical province of Santa Maria in southern Brazil.

Its cathedral episcopal see is Catedral da Nossa Senhora da Conceição, dedicated to Our Lady of Conception, in the city of Cachoeira do Sul, Rio Grande do Sul state.

History 
 Established on 17 July 1991 as Diocese of Cachoeira do Sul, on territory split off from the Diocese of Santa Maria (which became its Metropolitan).

Statistics 
As per 2015, it pastorally served 173,800 Catholics (74.0% of 234,900 total) on 10,730 km2 in 13 parishes with 24 priests (20 diocesan, 4 religious), 17 deacons, 23 lay religious (5 brothers, 18 sisters) and 8 seminarians.

Episcopal ordinaries 
(all Roman rite)

Suffragan Bishops of Cachoeira do Sul 
 Ângelo Domingos Salvador, Order of Capuchin Friars Minor (O.F.M. Cap.) (1991.07.17 – 1999.05.26); previously Titular Bishop of Selia (1981.03.16 – 1986.05.16) as Auxiliary Bishop of Archdiocese of São Salvador da Bahia (Brazil) (1981.03.16 – 1986.05.16), Bishop-Prelate of Territorial Prelature of Coxim (Brazil) (1986.05.16 – 1991.07.17); later Bishop of Uruguaiana (Brazil) (1999.05.26 – retirement 2007.06.27)
 Irineu Silvio Wilges, Order of Friars Minor (O.F.M.) (2000.06.14 – retired 2011.12.28)
 Remídio José Bohn (2011.12.28 - death 2018.01.06); previously Titular Bishop of Uchi Maius (2006.01.18 – 2011.12.28) as Auxiliary Bishop of Archdiocese of Porto Alegre (Brazil) (2006.01.18 – 2011.12.28)
 Edson Batista de Mello (2019.05.22 - present)

See also 
 List of Catholic dioceses in Brazil

Sources and References 

 GCatholic.org, with Google map, data for all sections
 Catholic Hierarchy
 official Diocesan website (Portuguese)

Roman Catholic dioceses in Brazil
Roman Catholic Ecclesiastical Province of Santa Maria
Roman Catholic dioceses established in 1991
Roman Catholic dioceses and prelatures established in the 20th century
1991 establishments in Brazil